Taiarapu may refer to a pair of municipalities of Tahiti, French Polynesia:

Taiarapu-Est
Taiarapu-Ouest